Conus harasewychi is a species of sea snail, a marine gastropod mollusk in the family Conidae, the cone snails, cone shells or cones.

These snails are predatory and venomous. They are capable of "stinging" humans.

Description
Original description: "Shell stocky, solid, broad across shoulder; shoulder somewhat rounded, distinctly coronated with large raised knobs; body whorl with numerous fine, beaded, spiral cords; spiral cords become stronger on anterior half of shell; body whorl uniformly dark mustard-yellow with thin, amorphous white band around mid-body; shoulder coronations and spire whorls white in color; anterior tip of shell and siphonal region dark brown; interior of aperture pale lavender."

The size of the shell attains 26 mm.

Distribution
Locus typicus: "North of Palm Beach Inlet, Palm Beach, Florida, USA."

This marine species occurs off Florida and the Bahamas at a depth of 30 m.

References

 Petuch, E. J. 1987. New Caribbean Molluscan Faunas. 31, plate 5, figure 7-8.
 Tucker J.K. & Tenorio M.J. (2013) Illustrated catalog of the living cone shells. 517 pp. Wellington, Florida: MdM Publishing.
 Puillandre N., Duda T.F., Meyer C., Olivera B.M. & Bouchet P. (2015). One, four or 100 genera? A new classification of the cone snails. Journal of Molluscan Studies. 81: 1-23

External links
  To World Register of Marine Species
 Gastropods.com: Purpuriconus cardinalis var. harasewychi 

harasewychi
Gastropods described in 1987